Zehlendorf is a village belonging to the city Oranienburg in Brandenburg. It was incorporated into Oranienburg on 26 October 2003.

The village was home to the Sender Zehlendorf, a transmission site for long wave and medium wave radio.

History
In the year 1335 the first documents mention the area as "Zedelndorp". In the year 1412 the area was called "Goetze" after the family name of the owners. After Louise Henriette acquired the land 1651, she leased the area of Zehlendorf to the town Oranienburg. One-hundred-twenty-four years later, in 1775, Zehlendorf became its own town. In the year 1819 the Prussian state leased the property Zehlendorf to Ernst Friedrich William Kienitz, the mayor of the town Friedrichsthal. In the year 1826 Zehlendorf was freed from the lease. In 1901 a railway station, Heidekrautbahn was opened, which led from Berlin to Liebenwalde. In the year 1927 the property was sold to the "German Society for Internal Colonization" headquartered in Berlin. This sale was part of a settlement with the local farmers, who had lost land due to the mining of clay and metal in order to supply Germania-Klinkerwerk. The property was also used as the working premises of the concentration camp Sachsenhausen, until 1945. In 1998 the western branch railways were shut down and the stations were closed, including the one at Zehlendorf. In 2003 Zehlendorf was incorporated into Oranienburg.

External links

Official Website (in German)
Waldbrand in Oranienburg (in German)
Quad-Touren in der Umgebung (in German)
Sehenswürdigkeiten (in German)

Villages in Brandenburg
Localities in Oberhavel
Oranienburg